Polydiscamide B, and related compounds, are sea sponge isolates and human sensory neuron-specific G protein coupled receptor agonists.

References

Receptor agonists
Bromoarenes
Tryptamines
Formamides
Sulfonic acids
Guanidines